Fireworks is the second album by the German hard rock band Bonfire. It was released in 1987 on the label BMG International with two different covers, the worldwide one had a patterned similar to a decorated vault door while the North American version was simply four pictures of each band member in each corner of the cover.  This album was recorded with a guest drummer, Ken Mary from Fifth Angel, because the band's drummer was fired during the writing sessions.  A new drummer was hired just before the band toured in support of Fireworks.  In 2003, the album was certified a Gold seller.  Originally the band had recorded 25 songs, settling on 11 tracks.

Track listing

Band members
Claus Lessmann - lead & backing vocals
Hans Ziller - lead, rhythm & acoustic guitars, backing vocals
Horst Maier - rhythm guitar, backing vocals
Jörg Deisinger - bass, backing vocals

Additional personnel
Ken Mary - drums, percussion
Martin Ernst - keyboards

Remastered Edition
In 2009 Fireworks was remastered by Toni Ubler for the company Yesterrock.  This edition of the album now featured 8 additional songs, all live performances by Bonfire from circa 1988 with Claus, Hans, Jörg playing in addition to new members Angel Schleifer and Edgar Patrik.  The track listing is as follows:

References
 Billboard's listing of Fireworks

Bonfire (band) albums
1987 albums